The 1958 Akron Zips football team represented Akron University in the 1958 NCAA College Division football season as a member of the Ohio Athletic Conference. Led by fifth-year head coach Joe McMullen, the Zips played their home games at the Rubber Bowl in Akron, Ohio. They finished the season with a record of 6–2–1 overall and 6–2 in OAC play. They outscored their opponents 166–82.

Schedule

References

Akron
Akron Zips football seasons
Akron Zips football